Matt Starr is an American drummer. He has performed with numerous artists and bands throughout his career, including Ace Frehley, Joe Lynn Turner, Love/Hate, Kevin DuBrow, and Mr. Big.

Career
In 2005, Starr co-wrote and recorded the Beautiful Creatures sophomore release, Deuce, and toured with the band the same year. The song "Freedom" was used in the 2009 Sandra Bullock film The Proposal. "Anyone", also from Deuce, was used in the FX series Sons of Anarchy. In late 2004, Starr formed the band Hookers & Blow with Guns N' Roses keyboardist Dizzy Reed and Quiet Riot guitarist Alex Grossi. The band toured the U.S. in 2004.

In 2007, the musician stepped away from drumming and formed The Automatic Music Explosion as a singer, and spent the next two years recording with multi-platinum producer Mike Chapman. The two met after Starr showed up at the producer's East Coast home and asked him to produce the record. Due to a lack of label support, the record never saw a proper release; however, several of the tracks were licensed to various cable television shows and movies, including SpongeBob SquarePants.

In the summer of 2012, Starr, together with Guns N' Roses guitarist Gilby Clarke, co-produced The Return to Psycho California, the debut release by hard rock band Hotel Diablo. The same year, Starr joined former KISS guitarist Ace Frehley's band. He played drums on Frehley's 2014 release, Space Invader. He is the only drummer other than Late Night with David Letterman drummer Anton Fig to play on the entirety of one of Frehley's records. Starr also played on several tracks from Frehley's subsequent releases, Origins, Vol. 1; Spaceman; and Origins Vol. 2. While remaining with Frehley, in 2013 Starr began playing with Burning Rain, a band formed by Whitesnake guitarist Doug Aldrich, Montrose vocalist Keith St John, and Dokken bassist Sean McNabb. He performed on their 2013 album, Epic Obsession.

In 2014, Starr began filling in for Mr. Big drummer Pat Torpey, who was diagnosed with Parkinson's disease. He sat in on the band's ...The Stories We Could Tell world tour and played on several tracks from their 2017 album, Defying Gravity. He went on to tour with Mr. Big once more as they promoted their latest release.

References

External links
 

Living people
American rock drummers
Year of birth missing (living people)
Mr. Big (American band) members
Burning Rain members